Motsepe is a common surname in Southern Africa. It is of Tswana origin.

Geographical distribution
As of 2014, 97.8% of all known bearers of the surname Motsepe were residents of South Africa.

In South Africa, the frequency of the surname was higher than national average in the following provinces:

 1. North West  (1:1,655)
 2. Gauteng  (1:2,070)
 3. Mpumalanga (1:4,026)

People
Bridgette Motsepe (born 1960), South African businesswoman and the sister of Patrice and Tshepo
Patrice Motsepe (born 1962), South African mining magnate and the brother of Bridgette and Tshepo
Patrick Motsepe (born 1983), Botswana footballer
Tshepo Motsepe (born 1953), South African first lady and the sister of Patrice and Bridgette

References

Tswana-language surnames